Gerald C. Murray (born 1885 in Montreal) was a Canadian clergyman and prelate for the Roman Catholic Diocese of Saskatoon, as well as Victoria and Winnipeg. He was appointed bishop in 1933. He died in 1951.

References 

1885 births
1951 deaths
Canadian Roman Catholic bishops